Harry Jeffries (birth unknown – death unknown), nicknamed "Frank", was an American Negro league infielder and manager between 1919 and 1937. 

Jeffries made his Negro leagues debut in 1919 with the Chicago Giants, and went on to play for a variety of teams over a career that spanned three decades. In 1928, he served as player-manager of the Cleveland Tigers.

References

External links
 and Baseball-Reference Black Baseball stats and Seamheads

Year of birth missing
Year of death missing
Place of birth missing
Place of death missing
Bacharach Giants players
Baltimore Black Sox players
Brooklyn Royal Giants players
Chicago American Giants players
Chicago Giants players
Cleveland Browns (baseball) players
Cleveland Tate Stars players
Cleveland Tigers (baseball) players
Detroit Stars players
Hilldale Club players
Negro league baseball managers
Newark Browns players
New York Black Yankees players
Baseball infielders